Sascha Imholz (born 15 November 1988) is a Swiss football midfielder, who currently plays for FC Lucerne in the Swiss Super League.

Career
On 9 February 2010 after eight and a half years, leave temporarily his club FC Lucerne. The young footballer who plays as a central defender or in the defensive midfield moves to the end of the season on loan at SC Kriens. He came to 13 caps in the Swiss Super League.

References
 

1988 births
Living people
Swiss men's footballers
FC Luzern players
Association football midfielders
People from the canton of Uri